Cladopsammia is a genus of stony cup corals in the family Dendrophylliidae. They are azooxanthellate corals, meaning that they do not contain symbiotic photosynthetic dinoflagellates as do many species of coral.

Species
The following species are listed in the World Register of Marine Species (WoRMS):

Cladopsammia echinata Cairns, 1984
Cladopsammia eguchii (Wells, 1982)
Cladopsammia gracilis (Milne Edwards & Haime, 1848)
Cladopsammia manuelensis (Chevalier, 1966)
Cladopsammia rolandi Lacaze-Duthiers, 1897
Cladopsammia willeyi (Gardiner, 1899)

References

Dendrophylliidae
Scleractinia genera